Károly Fogl, also known as Károly Fogoly, "Károly Újpesti" and "Fogl II" (19 January 1895 – 12 January 1969) was a Hungarian footballer who played for Újpest FC, as well as representing the Hungarian national football team at the 1924 Summer Olympics.

Fogl was born in Újpest, Budapest, Hungary. Between 1918 and 1929 he played 50 games and scored 2 goals for the Hungarian national team as a right defender. Together with his younger brother, József Fogl III, the two Fogls formed the legendary "Fogl-gate" (Fogl-gát in Hungarian), an extremely powerful and tough defending formation for more than a decade. Fogl II won the 1929–30 season with Újpest and served as a captain of the club for a decade.

After his player career, he went on to coach Sportklub Sofia and the Bulgarian national football team. Later he managed Juventus Bucuresti and in 1937 he led Győri ETO to the Hungarian top division NB I for the first time in the club's history. He was manager of the Polish football club Warta Poznań on three occasions: 1938-1939, 1947-1948 and 1950-1951, leading the club to their second national championship title in 1947. 

He died on 12 January 1969 in Budapest.

.

References

Footballers at the 1924 Summer Olympics
Hungarian footballers
Hungarian football managers
Hungary international footballers
Olympic footballers of Hungary
Újpest FC players
People from Újpest
Győri ETO FC managers
Bulgaria national football team managers
Polonia Warsaw managers
Warta Poznań managers
Hungarian people of German descent
1895 births
1969 deaths
Association football defenders
Hungarian expatriate football managers